Angelou Ezeilo (born 1970) is an American social entrepreneur and environmental activist. She is the founder of an international nonprofit, Greening Youth Foundation, that was created to engage underrepresented youth and young adults while connecting them to the outdoors and careers in conservation. She received an Ashoka Fellowship in 2016. She is the author of the book, Engage, Connect, Protect: Empowering Diverse Youth as Environmental Leaders, released in November 2019 by New Society Publishers and co-written by Nick Chiles, her brother.

Early life
Ezeilo was born Angelou Chiles in Jersey City, New Jersey, where she spent the early part of her childhood. Her mother Helen Chiles is a retired nurse. Her father is the pianist Walter Chiles, who was the leader of the jazz trio Chiles & Pettiford in the 1960s and the funk band LTG Exchange in the 1970s.

Ezeilo graduated  in 1988 from Mount St. Mary Academy, a private high school in Watchung, New Jersey. She attended Hunter College in Manhattan but transferred after freshman year to Spelman College in Atlanta. After graduating from Spelman in 1992, Ezeilo went on to receive her Juris Doctor from the University of Florida College of Law. At the College of Law, she met fellow law student James Ezeilo, whom she married in 1995.

Career
It was through Ezelio's work as a Legal Specialist for the New Jersey State Agriculture and Development Committee that motivated her to pursue a career as an environmentalist. Ezeilo worked as a project manager for the Trust for Public Land (TPL) in both its New Jersey and Georgia offices. In her position, Ezeilo acquired land for preservation and worked on the New York/New Jersey Highlands Program, Parks for People-Newark, the New York/New Jersey Harbor Program in New Jersey, the Atlanta Beltline and the 20 County Regional Greenspace Initiative in Georgia. While at TPL, Ezeilo realized the disconnect between the land that was being preserved and the education of people about that preservation, particularly as it related to the next generation. This was the impetus for the Greening Youth Foundation.

Creating nonprofit
Since launching in 2007, GYF has reached over 25,000 youth and young adults directly and indirectly through various environmental education, conservation and sustainability programs. Through strategic partnerships and growth, the organization now services the United States and West Africa. In 2015, GYF received the USDA Forest Service Award for Diversity and Inclusiveness.

Greening Youth Foundation's vision is to create a new generation of environmental stewards and provide life changing opportunities in conservation and sustainability to under served, underrepresented and diverse youth across the globe. With a multi-million-dollar budget, the organization served nearly a thousand youth in the last fiscal year.
Ezeilo is a member of the National Center for Civil and Human Right's Women in Solidarity Society and South Fork Conservancy boards; Advisory Board Member for the Arabia Mountain National Heritage Area, The Million Mile Greenway, Inc., Keeping It Wild, Inc., and Outdoor Afro; and board member for the Atlanta Audubon Society.
Ezeilo has been recognized as one of the world's leading social entrepreneurs as an Ashoka Fellow in 2016. Ezeilo is on the Steering Committee for a new endeavor called the Children's Wellbeing Initiative—a network of 22 Change-Makers working together to promote children's wellbeing across the country.

Ezeilo lives in Atlanta with her husband James, who assists her in running GYF. They have two children.

References

1965 births
Hunter College alumni
Spelman College alumni
University of Florida alumni
People from Jersey City, New Jersey
Social entrepreneurs
Ashoka USA Fellows
American women environmentalists
American environmentalists
Living people